Beatrix Philipp (née Hellweg; 7 July 1945 – 1 May 2019) was a German politician for the Christian Democratic Union (CDU). She initially served on the city council of Düsseldorf from 1975 to 1985 before becoming a member of the Landtag of North Rhine-Westphalia. In 1994, she was elected to the national Bundestag, serving until 2013. Outside of politics, Philipp was a headmistress.

Philipp was born in Mönchengladbach. She had two children and was a Roman Catholic. She died in 2019, at the age of 73, in Düsseldorf.

References

External links

 Beatrix Philipp at Parliamentwatch 

1945 births
2019 deaths
Female members of the Bundestag
German Roman Catholics
German city councillors
Members of the Bundestag for North Rhine-Westphalia
Members of the Landtag of North Rhine-Westphalia
People from Mönchengladbach
Heads of schools in Germany
Members of the Bundestag 2009–2013
Members of the Bundestag 2005–2009
Members of the Bundestag 2002–2005
Members of the Bundestag 1998–2002
Members of the Bundestag 1994–1998
Members of the Bundestag for the Christian Democratic Union of Germany
20th-century German women
21st-century German women politicians